Clear Lake High School may refer to:
Clear Lake High School (California)
Clear Lake High School (Iowa)
Clear Lake High School (Texas)
Clear Lake High School (Wisconsin)